The Fitzroy Doncaster Cricket Club, nicknamed the Lions, play cricket in the elite club competition of Melbourne, Australia, known as Victorian Premier Cricket. The club was formed by a 1986 amalgamation of Fitzroy Cricket Club, a foundation member of Victorian Premier Cricket in 1905, and Doncaster Cricket Club, a Victorian Sub-District Association team formed in 1864. The Lions play at Schramms Reserve in Doncaster.

Honours

Club Championships
 1939/40
 1957/58
 1960/61
 1961/62
 2017/18

Premierships
Premierships and Runners-up for all the clubs elevens since the clubs induction into the VCA in 1906.

Two Day Premierships
 1st XI – 1930/31, 1938/39, 1939/40, 1953/54, 1960/61, 1966/67, 1993/94, 2001/02, 2015/16, 2016/17
 2nd XI – 1909/10, 1934/35, 2007/08, 2013/14
 3rd XI – 1954/55, 1960/61, 1961/62, 1962/63, 1967/68, 1968/69, 1970/71, 2001/02

One Day Premierships
 1st XI – 1993/94 (CUB Shield – No Final Played), 2015–16
 2nd XI – 2003/04, 2010/11
 4th XI – 2010/11

Player Honours

Club Legends

Hall of Fame
The Hall of Fame was announced at the club's 150 Year anniversary dinner celebrated in 2013. Eligible players had to adhere to the following criteria in order to qualify:
 Players had retired from playing at least five years.
 Players had to have played at least 100 games, including representative games.
 In the case of a batsman a minimum of 4500 runs was achieved.
 In the case of a bowler a minimum of 300 wickets were taken.
 In the case of an all-rounder a points system was used.

International Representatives
Players who have represented their country and have also played for the Fitzroy Doncaster Cricket Club.

 Neil Harvey
 Rob Bailey
 Roshan Mahanama
 John Stephenson
 Dirk Nannes
 Glenn Maxwell
Alex Hales

Victorian Representatives
Players who have represented the Victorian Bushrangers and have also played for the Fitzroy Doncaster Cricket Club.

 John Scholes
 Gary Watts
 Darren Berry
 Lloyd Mash
 Dirk Nannes
 Glenn Maxwell

John Scholes Medal winners
The medal awarded to the best Premier Cricket player of the final voted by the umpires.
 Jarrod Travaglia 2001/02
 Peter Dickson 2015/16

Jack Ryder Medal winners
The medal awarded to the best Premier Cricket player of the season voted by the umpires.
 Mark Ridgway 1991/92
 Gary Watts 1993/94
 Brendan Joyce 1995/96
 Christopher Street 2002/03
 Trent Lawford 2017/18

Premier Cricket Team of the Season
 Brendan Joyce 2000/01, 2001/02
 David Plumpton 2001/02
 Chris Street 2002/03
 Jon Fagg 2005/06
 Peter Dickson 2006/07, 2008/09, 2009/10
 Glenn Maxwell 2008/09
 Lloyd Mash 2010/11, 2012/13
 Andrew Perrin 2015/16
 Trent Lawford 2017/18
 Ejaaz Alavi 2017/18

2nd XI Player of the Season
The award is presented to the best Premier Cricket player of the season voted by the umpires.
 Matthew Bremner 2015/16

3rd XI Player of the Season
The award is presented to the best Premier Cricket player of the season voted by the umpires.
 Timothy Considine 1992/93
 Fletcher Stewart 2007/08
 Kyle Humphrys 2009/10

4th XI Player of the Season
The award is presented to the best Premier Cricket player of the season voted by the umpires.
 Vasish Vasan 2016/17

Don Patrick Medal
The Don Patrick Medal is an award voted by the players. After every round, three players from each team vote on their three best performed players in the game. At the end of the season, the votes are tallied up and the winner is crowned the player's Most Valuable Player (MVP). Don Patrick, whom the award is named after is a club stalwart, a person who has been involved in the club since the amalgamation in 1986.

Club

Club song
We are the boys from old Fitzroy,
We wear the colours maroon and gold,
We will always strive for victory,
We will always see it through.
Win or lose we do or die,
And in defeat we always try,
Fitzroy Fitzroy the team we love so dear,
Premiers we'll be this year.

Harvey Watts Development Academy
The Harvey-Watts Development Squad was established in 2004. Its purpose is to immerse up-and-coming cricketers in a Premier Cricket environment. It is aptly named after the two most prolific and successful families of the Fitzroy and Fitzroy-Doncaster Cricket Clubs.

Records

Club records

Batting records

Partnership records

Bowling records

Wicketkeeping records

Twenty20 records

1st XI Honour Roll

Grounds

Schramms Reserve
Schramms Reserve is the Home of the Lions, also known as "The Lions' Den". In 1993/94 the Main Oval was voted the best ground in Premier Cricket, while the bottom ground was awarded the same honour in 1993/94, 1994/95 and 1998/99.

Brunswick Street Oval
The Brunswick Street Oval, currently known as WT Peterson Community Oval, also known as the Fitzroy Cricket Ground is a cricket and Australian rules football ground located in Edinburgh Gardens in Fitzroy North, Victoria. The ground was the home of Fitzroy Cricket Club up until its amalgamation 1986 with the Doncaster Cricket Club, Fitzroy Football Club in the VFA from 1883 to 1897, and the home of the club in the VFL from 1897 until 1966, with the last game being played there on Saturday 20 August 1966 against St Kilda, a game which the Lions lost by 84 points.

Admin

References

External links
 
 LionsTV

Victorian Premier Cricket clubs
Cricket clubs in Melbourne
1985 establishments in Australia
Cricket in Melbourne
Fitzroy, Victoria
Sport in the City of Manningham